Priti, also known as Karnotpala, is a Hindu goddess. She is one of the two consorts of the god of love, Kamadeva, along with Rati. 

Priti is regarded to represent affectionate love, while her co-wife, Rati, represents sensual pleasure. In other interpretations, Priti is regarded to be merely an epithet of Rati.

Legend 
Priti weds Kamadeva to become his second consort. She is also described to be an aspect of Vishnu's divine feminine energy.

Priti accompanies her consort, Kamadeva, in his quest to disturb the penance of the deity Shiva, in order to cause him to fall in love with Parvati.

The Garuda Purana prescribes the worship of Priti alongside Kamadeva and Rati.

References 

Hindu goddesses